The Brandenburg Euthanasia Centre, officially known as the Brandenburg an der Havel State Welfare Institute (Landes-Pflegeanstalt Brandenburg a. H.), was a killing centre established in 1939 as part of the Nazi euthanasia programme, known after the war as "Aktion T4". Nearly 10,000 people were murdered there during its operation, primarily those with mental and physical disabilities.

Overview 
The killing centre was located in Brandenburg an der Havel in the old gaol in Neuendorfer Straße 90c. Brandenburg Concentration Camp was housed in these buildings from August 1933 to February 1934.

A concentration camp, one of the first in Germany, was located on Neuendorfer Straße in Brandenburg Old Town. After closing this inner city concentration camp, the Nazis used the Brandenburg-Görden Prison, located in Görden, a suburb of Brandenburg. Later the old gaol became the Brandenburg Euthanasia Centre where the Nazis killed people with mental problems, including children. They called this operation "Action T4" because of the Berlin address, Tiergartenstraße 4, the headquarters of this planned and well-organized killing "euthanasia" organisation. Brandenburg an der Havel was one of the first locations in the Third Reich where the Nazis experimented with killing their victims by gas. This foreshadowed the mass killings in Auschwitz and other extermination camps. After complaints by local inhabitants about the smoke, the mobile furnaces used to burn the corpses ceased operation. Shortly after this, the Nazis closed the old prison.

At the Centre Christian Wirth experimented in developing gas chambers for gassing the physically and mentally disabled. The killing of people with carbon monoxide started in January 1940 at the Centre headed by Irmfried Eberl. The gas chambers were disguised as showers. The victims were take to the Centre under the false statement, that they were being transferred to a mental hospital.

Victim numbers 
According to a table compiled in 1942 and discovered in 1945, the so-called Hartheim Statistics,  a total of 9,772 people were murdered in a gas chamber at the Brandenburg Euthanasia Centre in 1940.

These statistics only cover the first killing phase, under Action T4, that was halted by an order from Hitler dated 24 August 1941.

See also
Hartheim killing centre
Am Spiegelgrund clinic

References and footnotes

Sources 
  (Probevergasung, Hungerkost)

External links 
 www.doew.at 
 Table from the Hartheim Statistics (PDF)

Aktion T4 euthanasia centres
20th century in Brandenburg
Brandenburg an der Havel